Grupa Regina  is a Bosnian rock band founded in 1989 in Sarajevo, Bosnia and Herzegovina, then part of Yugoslavia. The band has so far released eleven studio albums, one compilation album and two singles.

History

Beginnings and success
Aleksandar Čović, Goran Lučić, and the Milijaš brothers began a garage band. After searching, they found Davor Ebner, who became their lead singer. Bojan Milićević joined the group in 1990 (before the release of the first album). Once the band was created, it was immediately successful all over Yugoslavia with the slogan "MI NISMO MERLIN, MI SMO REGINA" ("We aren't Merlin, we're Regina").

When the Yugoslav Wars began in Bosnia and Herzegovina, Serb members of the band fled to Belgrade, where Regina continued until 2000, when Čović started his solo career. In 2005, the band reunited with the original members and appeared at a Serbian radio festival organized by Radio S. In 2007, they were an opening act at The Rolling Stones concert at Jaz Beach, Budva.

Eurovision 2009

On 16 May 2009, the band performed in the Eurovision Song Contest 2009, with the song called "Bistra voda" ("Clear Water"). After winning one of ten places from the first semi-final, they eventually finished in 9th place in the final (with 106 points).

Post-Eurovision
In June 2009, Regina released their album Vrijeme je (It's Time), featuring the songs Vrijeme je, Bježi dok sam mlad and Zvaću te pile moje. It also features English and Russian versions of Bistra Voda. In 2011, Regina released their album Kad poludimo (When we go crazy). In 2014, the band released the singles Kalimero and Zatupi Zaglupi. In 2016, Regina published their biography called Ljubav nije za nas (Love isn't for us). On 16 August 2016, bassist Denis Čabrić died of a heart attack on holiday in Croatia with his family at the age of 49.

On 10 February 2017, the band released their 12th studio album called U Srcu (In the Heart).

In late December 2021, it was stated and confirmed that Davor Ebner, Regina's lead vocalist, left the band.

Discography

Studio albums
Regina (1990)
Ljubav nije za nas (1991)
Oteto od zaborava (1994)
Godine lete (1995)
Ja nisam kao drugi (1997)
Kad zatvorim oči (1999)
Devedesete (2000)
Sve mogu ja (2006)
Vrijeme je (2009)
Kad poludimo (2012)
U srcu (2017)

Compilation albums
Regina (reproduction) (1992)

Singles
Kalimero (2014)
Zatupi Zaglupi (2014)

References

External links
Official Website 
My Space Profile 

Bosnia and Herzegovina musical groups
Eurovision Song Contest entrants for Bosnia and Herzegovina
Eurovision Song Contest entrants of 2009
Musical groups established in 1990
Yugoslav rock music groups